A tripod is a three-legged support device.

Tripod may also refer to:

Three-legged devices
 Tripod (foundation), a type of structural foundation for offshore wind turbines
 Tripod (gun), a type of weapon mount
 Tripod (laboratory), a platform used to support laboratory equipment
 Tripod (photography), a stand used to stabilize and elevate photographic equipment
 Tripod (surveying), a stand used to support surveying instruments
 Sacrificial tripod, a piece of religious furniture used for offerings
 Tripod joints, a type of constant-velocity joint, used at the inboard end of car driveshafts

Arts and entertainment
 TriPod, an American rock trio
 Tripod (band), an Australian musical comedy act
 Tripod, an informal name for the self-titled album by Alice in Chains, 1995
 Tripod (War of the Worlds), a fictional alien vehicle in The War of the Worlds
 The Tripods, a novel series by John Christopher
 The Tripods (TV series), a 1984–1985 adaptation of the novels

Other uses
 Tripod (Neocatechumanate precept), a precept of the Neocatechumenal Way, an association within the Catholic Church
 Tripod (web hosting), a web hosting service
 Tripod Island, Antarctica
 Tripod Rock, a balancing rock in Kinnelon, New Jersey, US

See also
 Tripod fish (disambiguation)
 Triangle, a polygon with three edges
 Tricorne, a style of hat
 Triskelion, a motif consisting of a triple spiral
 Tetrapod (disambiguation)